Oligothrix is a genus of flowering plants in the groundsel tribe within the sunflower family.

Species
The only known species is Oligothrix gracilis, native to South Africa.

formerly included
see Psednotrichia 
 Oligothrix newtonii O.Hoffm. - Psednotrichia newtonii (O.Hoffm.) Anderb. & P.O.Karis
 Oligothrix xyridopsis O.Hoffm. - Psednotrichia xyridopsis (O.Hoffm.) Anderb. & P.O.Karis

References

Senecioneae
Monotypic Asteraceae genera
Endemic flora of South Africa